Jérémie Peiffer (born 7 April 1980) is a Luxembourgian football player.

External links

1980 births
Living people
Luxembourg international footballers
Luxembourgian footballers
Association football midfielders
Jeunesse Esch players 
FC Progrès Niederkorn players 
FC Differdange 03 players 
CS Fola Esch players